The Healthy Meals for Healthy Americans Act of 1994 (P.L. 103-448) reauthorized several expiring programs under the National School Lunch Act (P.L. 79-396, as amended; 42 U.S.C. 1751 et seq.) and Child Nutrition Amendments of 1966 (P.L. 89-642) through FY1998. Required that federally subsidized meal programs conform their meal requirements to the Dietary Guidelines for Americans, permanently authorized the nutrition education and training program and made it an entitlement, and expanded the outreach and coordination of WIC. Subsequently, P.L. 104-193 restored NET to discretionary status and to a multi-year authorization rather than a permanent authorization.

This law was superseded by William F. Goodling Child Nutrition Reauthorization Act of 1998 (P.L. 105-336).

See also 
 Institute of Child Nutrition

References 

United States federal agriculture legislation
United States federal health legislation
Acts of the 103rd United States Congress